Waheed Abdul-Ridha Waheed Karaawi (born May 22, 1983) is an Iraqi boxer. He competed at the 2016 Summer Olympics in the men's middleweight event, in which he was eliminated in the round of 32 by Misael Rodríguez. He was the flag bearer for Iraq at the Parade of Nations.

References

1983 births
Living people
Iraqi male boxers
Olympic boxers of Iraq
Boxers at the 2016 Summer Olympics
Boxers at the 2010 Asian Games
Boxers at the 2014 Asian Games
Asian Games competitors for Iraq
Middleweight boxers